Presidential elections were held in Colombia in February 1922. The result was a victory for Pedro Nel Ospina of the Conservative Party, who received 62% of the vote. He took office on 7 August.

His main opponent, Benjamín Herrera of the Liberal Party, was also supported by the Socialist Party. The Liberal Party claimed that the election had been marred by blatant fraud.

Results

References

Presidential elections in Colombia
1922 in Colombia
Colombia
Election and referendum articles with incomplete results